Alma de ángel is a Mexican comedy television series produced by Nazareno P. Brancatto for Televisa that aired on Las Estrellas from 2 September 2019 to 25 November 2019. The series stars Niurka Marcos.

Plot 
Ángel is devastated by the sudden death of his wife Alma, with whom he had lived with for 20 years. Everything happened so suddenly, that Ángel has no idea how to process it. Alma is in the same situation, she doesn't know that she is dead and is trapped in her house, until she resolves her problems on earth. Heaven and hell will dispute her soul, while she tries to take care of her family, being a ghost that can only communicate with her loved ones through the body of Paco, Ángel's best friend.

Cast

Main 
 Niurka Marcos as Alma
 Julio Bracho as Ángel
 Raúl Araiza as Paco
 Verónica Jaspeado as Demonio Gloria
 Juan Ugarte as Arcángel Uriel
 Diego Tenorio as Juan José Rivapalacio
 Lizeth Goca as Alexa Rivapalacio

Recurring 
 Adrián Di Monte as Dios

Production 
Filming of the first season began on 23 May 2019 and concluded on 21 June 2019. The season consisted of 13 episodes.

Episodes 

Notes

References

External links 
 

2019 Mexican television series debuts
2019 Mexican television series endings
Mexican television sitcoms
Television series by Televisa
Spanish-language television shows